John Mason may refer to:

Entertainment
 John Mason (playwright) (fl. 1609), British playwright
 John Mason (poet) (1646–1694), English clergyman, poet, and hymn-writer
 John B. Mason (1858–1919), American stage actor
 John Mason (artist) (1927–2019), ceramic artist from Los Angeles, California
 John M. Mason (musician) (1940–2011), Scottish solicitor, musician, composer and conductor
 Ralph Mason (John Francis Mason, 1938–2016), English tenor

Politics

U.S.
 John Thomson Mason (1765–1824), American jurist and Attorney General of Maryland in 1806
 John Thomson Mason (1787–1850), American lawyer, United States marshal
 John Y. Mason (1799–1859), U.S. Representative from Virginia and Secretary of the Navy
 John Calvin Mason (1802–1865), U.S. Representative from Kentucky
 John Thomson Mason Jr. (1815–1873), U.S. Representative from Maryland, son of John Thomson Mason (1765–1824)

U.K.
 John Mason (15th-century MP), Member of Parliament for Lewes and East Grinstead
 John Mason (diplomat) (1503–1566), British diplomat and spy
 John Mason (governor) (1586–1635), founder of the Province of New Hampshire and governor of Newfoundland
 John Mason (Scottish politician) (born 1957), Member of Parliament for Glasgow East and Member of the Scottish Parliament for Glasgow Shettleston
 John Mason (British diplomat) (1927–2008), UK High Commissioner to Australia

Elsewhere
 John James Mason (1842–1903), Canadian politician
 John Mason (New Zealand politician) (1880–1975), New Zealand politician
 John Mason (Australian politician) (born 1928), member of the New South Wales Legislative Assembly
 Sir John Mason (died 1720), Irish MP for County Waterford
 John Mason (died 1738), Irish MP for the city of Waterford
 John Monck Mason (1726–1809), Irish politician and literary scholar

Science
 John Alden Mason (1885–1967), archaeological anthropologist and linguist
 John Mason (meteorologist) (1923–2015), British meteorologist
 John Wayne Mason (1924–2014), American physiologist and stress researcher

Sports
 John Mason (American football) (fl. 1920s–1950s), American college football player and coach
 John Mason (announcer), sports announcer for the Detroit Pistons basketball team
 John Mason (cricketer) (born 1984), English cricketer
 John Mason (runner) (born 1987), Canadian long-distance runner
 John Mason (soccer) (born 1953), Scottish-American soccer defender
 Jack Mason (John Richard Mason, 1874–1958), cricketer

Others
 John Mason (c. 1600–1672) (1600–1672), Commander of the Connecticut forces in the 1637 Pequot War
 John Mason (minister) (1706–1763), English nonconformist minister and author
 John Mason (businessman) (1773–1839), American banker
 John Mason (planter) (1766–1849), American banker and planter, son of George Mason
 John Charles Mason (1798–1881), British East India Company secretary and diplomat
 John M. Mason (theologian) (1770–1829), American preacher and theologian
 John Mason (outlaw) (died 1866), bushwhacker and bandit
 John S. Mason (1824–1897), Union general in the American Civil War
 John Landis Mason (1832–1902), who patented glass-threaded mason jars used in food preservation
 John Mason (historian) (1920–2009), British historian and Oxford academic
 John Mason (schoolmaster) (born 1945), Indian educationist
 John Mason (astronomer), former president of the British Astronomical Association
 Minor planet 6092 Johnmason,  named after him
 John Mason (master), master of the Prince of Wales in the First Fleet

Other uses
 John Mason School, a secondary school in Abingdon, UK.

See also
 Mason (surname)
 John Thomson Mason (disambiguation)
 Jonathan Mason (disambiguation)